Bernhard Eriksson (19 April 1878 – 18 April 1952) was a Swedish social democratic politician. He was Minister for Naval Affairs in 1920 and Speaker of the Riksdags second chamber 1928–1932. He also served as Governor of Dalarna from 1932 to 1944.

References 

1878 births
1952 deaths
Speakers of Andra kammaren
Members of the Andra kammaren
Government ministers of Sweden
Members of the Riksdag from the Social Democrats